Edward Bishopp may refer to:

Sir Edward Bishopp, 2nd Baronet (1602–1649), MP for Bletchingley, Bramber and Steyning
Sir Edward Bishopp, 11th Baronet (1826–1870), of the Bishopp baronets

See also
Edward Bishop (disambiguation)
Bishopp (surname)